A list of the most films produced in the Cinema of Mexico ordered by year of release in the 2010s. For an alphabetical list of articles on Mexican films see :Category:Mexican films.

2010
 List of Mexican films of 2010

2011
 List of Mexican films of 2011

2012
List of Mexican films of 2012

2013
 List of Mexican films of 2013

2014
 List of Mexican films of 2014

2015
 List of Mexican films of 2015

2016
 List of Mexican films of 2016

2017
 List of Mexican films of 2017

2018
 List of Mexican films of 2018

2019
 List of Mexican films of 2019

External links
 Mexican film at the Internet Movie Database

Mexican
Films

fr:Liste de films mexicains
zh:墨西哥電影列表